Kathua railway station is a railway station in Kathua which is in Kathua district and city and a Municipal Council in the Indian union territory of Jammu and Kashmir. It serves All India. Around 54 trains stop at Kathua railway station.<ref>
Station Master's at Present-
Brajendra Kumar/Station Superintendent.

Vijay Bhushan Raina/Station Master. 

Sandeep Singh Parmar/Station Master.

Electrification
The entire Jalandhar–Jammu section, Jammu Tawi station and sidings have been completely energised at 25 kV AC and approved for electric traction in August 2014. Swaraj Express now gets an end to end WAP-4 from Jammu Tawi to Bandra Terminus. Himgiri Express now gets an end to end WAP-7 from Jammu Tawi to Howrah.

See also

 Jammu–Baramulla line
 Northern Railways
 List of railway stations in Jammu and Kashmir

References

External links
Ministry of Indian Railways official website

Firozpur railway division
Railway stations in Kathua district